Kiri Sidetracks: The Jazz Album is a 1992 jazz vocal album by the operatic soprano Kiri Te Kanawa, accompanied by a jazz trio of André Previn, Mundell Lowe and Ray Brown.

Track listing
 "A Sleepin' Bee" (Harold Arlen, Truman Capote)  – 3:55
 "Honeysuckle Rose" (Andy Razaf, Fats Waller)  – 5:06
 "Cute" (Stanley Styne, Neal Hefti)  – 3:02
 "It Could Happen to You" (Johnny Burke, Jimmy Van Heusen)  – 2:44
 "Like Someone in Love" (Johnny Burke, Jimmy Van Heusen)  – 4:40
 "Autumn Leaves" (Jacques Prévert, Johnny Mercer, Joseph Kosma)  – 3:58
 "It Never Was You" (Kurt Weill, Maxwell Anderson)  – 3:29
 "The Shadow of Your Smile" (Paul Francis Webster, Johnny Mandel)  – 5:12
 "Too Marvelous for Words" (Johnny Mercer, Richard Whiting)  – 3:46
 "Angel Eyes" (Earl Brent, Matt Dennis)  – 4:22
 "Why Don't You Do Right" (Joe McCoy)  – 3:50
 "The Second Time Around" (Sammy Cahn, Jimmy Van Heusen)  – 4:59
 "Teach Me Tonight" (Sammy Cahn, Gene DePaul)  – 3:10
 "Polka Dots and Moonbeams" (Johnny Burke, Jimmy Van Heusen)  – 5:01
 "It's Easy to Remember" (Richard Rodgers, Lorenz Hart)  – 5:40

Personnel
Kiri Te Kanawa – vocals
Ray Brown – double bass
Mundell Lowe – guitar
André Previn – piano

References

1992 albums
Kiri Te Kanawa albums
PolyGram albums
Vocal jazz albums